Astroblepus nicefori is a species of catfish of the family Astroblepidae. It can be found of the Cauca River and the Magdalena River in Colombia.

Named in honor of Brother Hermano Nicéforo María (1888-1980), Museo del Instituto de La Salle, Bogotá; a Frenchman originally named Antoine Rouhaire Siauzade who became a missionary in Colombia under his monastic name, he sent a collection of Colombian freshwater fishes to Myers, including the type specimen of this one.

References

Bibliography 
 Eschmeyer, William N., ed. 1998. Catalog of Fishes. Special Publication of the Center for Biodiversity Research and Information, num. 1, vol. 1–3. California Academy of Sciences. San Francisco, California, United States. 2905. .

Astroblepus
Freshwater fish of Colombia
Magdalena River
Taxa named by George S. Myers
Fish described in 1932